Hari Bhakta is a 1956 Kannada-language film directed by T. V. Singh Thakur. The film stars Rajkumar and Pandari Bai. It had Mynavathi, Narasimharaju, G. V. Iyer, H. R. Shastry playing supporting roles. The movie is based on the life of Pundarika which had earlier been adapted in Tamil in 1944 as Haridas and later in Telugu in 1957 as Panduranga Mahatyam.

Cast
 Rajkumar as Hari / Pundarika
 Pandari Bai as Lakshmi, Hari's wife
 Mynavathi
 Narasimharaju as Shankar, Hari's friend
 G. V. Iyer
 H. R. Shastry as Hari's father
 Shanthamma as Hari's mother

Soundtrack
The music of the film was composed by G. K. Venkatesh and lyrics written by K. R. Seetharama Sastry.

References

External links
 
 Hari Bhakta on Chiloka

1956 films
1950s Kannada-language films
Indian black-and-white films
Films scored by G. K. Venkatesh